Hypocrita phanoptoides is a moth of the family Erebidae. It was described by Zerny in 1928. It is found in Colombia and Ecuador.

References

Hypocrita
Moths described in 1928